Booth Island (or Wandel Island) is a rugged, Y-shaped island,  long and rising to  off the northwest coast of Kyiv Peninsula in Graham Land, Antarctica in the northeastern part of the Wilhelm Archipelago. The narrow passage between the island and the mainland is the Lemaire Channel.

History 
The island was discovered and named by a German expedition under Eduard Dallmann 1873–74, probably for Oskar Booth or Stanley Booth, or both, members of the Hamburg Geographical Society at that time. The Belgian Antarctic Expedition of 1897–1899 applied the name "Wandel Island", for Danish polar explorer and hydrographer Carl Frederick Wandel, but the United States Advisory Committee on Antarctic Names rejected the name in favor of the earlier Booth Island. The name Wandel was retained for the island's highest point.

Although many of the island's features were probably first seen by Dallmann's expedition, the island was not charted in detail until the Third French Antarctic Expedition, 1903–1905. The majority of the island's features were named by expedition leader Jean-Baptiste Charcot. The names he gave were generally for expedition members, notable French scientists, or friends and family of Charcot.

The sea slug species Curnon granulosa was first described in 1906 from a single specimen found at 40 m depth at Booth Island.

Geography 
Booth Island has an irregular Y-shape, with a long narrow peninsula that stretches north off the main body of the island, indented on its west coast by a large bay known as Port Charcot, and a shorter rocky peninsula to the west. It is separated from the mainland to the east by a narrow passage called the Lemaire Channel. To the west, Libois Bay separates Booth Island from tiny Cholet Island, and Rallier Channel separates it from Rallier Island.

Coastal features 
Turquet Point marks the north extremity of the island, at the tip of the long narrow peninsula sometimes called the Mount Lacroix peninsula for the large mountain that surmounts it. To the west along the coast is Brouardel Point, a headland north of Port Charcot.

Charcot established the French expedition's winter base at Port Charcot in 1904. A cairn at Port Charcot, with a wooden pillar and a plaque inscribed with the names of the members of the French expedition, has been designated a Historic Site or Monument (HSM 28), following a proposal by Argentina to the Antarctic Treaty Consultative Meeting.

Along the southern shore of Port Charcot, Vanssay Point marks the extremity of a small peninsula which extends north into the water of the port. To the west, Français Cove, named for one of Charcot's ships, indents the south shore of Port Charcot. A small island, Sögen Island, forms the east side of Francais Cove.

Paumelle Point marks the south side of the entrance to Libois Bay and the northwest end of the peninsula that forms the west extremity of the island. The end of the rocky western peninsula is indented by a small cove called Roland Bay, whose south end is marked by Hervéou Point, the western extremity of the peninsula. Charcot named the bay for the Hôpital de la Salpêtrière, a Paris hospital where his father, neurologist Jean-Martin Charcot, founded a clinic.

Roullin Point marks the island's southern tip.

Inland features 
It was named by Charcot after French mineralogist Alfred Lacroix. Cléry Peak is a peak on the north side of Mount Lacroix.

There are several high peaks on the north–south trending ridge of the island.

In 2003, Australian mountaineer Damien Gildea called it "one of the most challenging unclimbed objectives on the Antarctic Peninsula". On 15 February 2006 the peak was reached by a group of Spanish alpinists, who still avoided the last  of the mushroomlike top.

See also 
 Composite Antarctic Gazetteer
 List of Antarctic and sub-Antarctic islands
 List of Antarctic islands south of 60° S
 Scientific Committee on Antarctic Research
 Territorial claims in Antarctica

References

External links

Secretariat of the Antarctic Treaty Visitor Site Guidelines and island description
Atlas of Antarctic Research, U.S. Geological Survey

Islands of the Wilhelm Archipelago